Redwater Lake may refer to:

Upper Redwater Lake, a lake in Ontario, Canada
Lower Redwater Lake, a lake in Ontario, Canada